Caloceras is an extinct genus of cephalopod belonging to the ammonite subclass.

Distribution
Jurassic of Argentina, Austria, Canada, the United Kingdom

References

Psiloceratidae
Ammonitida genera
Jurassic ammonites of North America
Hettangian life